The 2019 Coahuila Challenger 604 Crash refers to the fatal crash of a Bombardier Challenger 601-3A on May 5, 2019. Two crew members and eleven passengers lost their lives.

Background 

The plane took off from Las Vegas with passenger reportedly returning attending a boxing match on the afternoon of May 5, 2019, and was to land at Monterrey, northeastern Mexico. However, air traffic controllers lost contact with the aircraft over Coahuila. Bombardier confirms that the Challenger 601 went missing about 150 nm (280 km) from the northern Mexican city of Monclova.

According to Agencia Federal de Aviación Civil, the accident was caused by “a loss of control due to a rapid climb and inversion caused by severe atmospheric instability, inducing both engines to shut down” and "inability of the aircraft’s [weather] radar to provide information for an undetermined reason.”

According to Aviation Safety Network, the crew had been approved permission to climb to FL390. Nine minutes later the aircraft entered the green zone of the weather system which caused the turbulence to increase with vertical acceleration values of between 1.40 and 0.68 g. The crew then requested to climb to FL410, which was the maximum certified operating altitude for the aircraft. This request was also approved by Monterrey International Airport. The aircraft entered the core of the most intense part of the weather system where turbulence began to become more severe and soon got to higher altitudes, rolled and nose dived. It then impacted terrain at an elevation of 1088 m.

References 

Aviation accidents and incidents in 2019
Aviation accidents and incidents in Mexico